The 2009 World Series of Poker was the 40th annual World Series of Poker (WSOP). It was held at the Rio All Suite Hotel and Casino in Las Vegas, Nevada, and ran from May 27 to July 15. There were 57 bracelet events, culminating in the $10,000 No-Limit Hold'em Main Event. The "November Nine" concept returned for the second year, with the finalists of the Main Event returning to finish the tournament on November 7.

Event schedule

Main Event
The $10,000 World Championship No Limit Texas Hold 'em Main Event began on July 3 with the first of four starting days. 	There were 6,494 total entries.  After reaching the final table of nine players on July 15, the final table was once again delayed until November 7. The main event once again was a draw for many celebrities to play including:

Day 1-a: Jason Alexander, Brad Garrett, Orel Hershiser, Nelly, Jennifer Tilly,
Day 1-b: Shane Warne
Day 1-c: Antonio Tarver, Paul Wight
Day 1-d: Shannon Elizabeth, Sully Erna, Jordan Farmar, Audley Harrison, Scott Ian, Lou Diamond Phillips, Ray Romano, John Salley, Nate Silver, Sam Simon, Marlon Wayans, Torrie Wilson

The last day one, day 1d, had by far the highest number of participants, 2,809 (the lowest was day 1b (4 July), 873). According to news reports, as many as 500 players, including Patrik Antonius, T. J. Cloutier, Layne Flack and Ted Forrest, were denied entry because capacity was filled.

Players started with 30,000 chips, up from 20,000 in previous Main Events.

Performance of past champions

Other notable high finishes
NB: This list is restricted to top 30 finishers with an existing Wikipedia entry.

November Nine

As in 2008, the final nine players returned on November 7 to complete the event. These players were as follows:

*Career statistics prior to the beginning of the 2009 Main Event.

Harrah's deposited the remaining prizepool of $15,847,250 into a risk-free interest-bearing account back on July 16, 2009 up until November 2, 2009. This was the total money left over in the prize pool after each member of the November Nine was paid out ninth-place money ($1,263,602). The remaining money accrued $1,321 in interest and was distributed throughout the payouts. The 2009 final table lasted for 364 hands, including 88 hands of heads up play.

Final table

Notable achievements
 Jeff Lisandro became the first player to win a bracelet in each of the Stud disciplines in the same World Series. In doing so, Lisandro was the first player to win three WSOP bracelets in the same year since Phil Ivey achieved this feat in 2002.
 In addition to Lisandro, Ivey, Brock Parker and Greg Mueller won multiple bracelets during the series.
 Ville Wahlbeck, who won Event 12, became the first Finnish player to win a bracelet.
 Péter Traply, who won Event 41, became the first Hungarian player to win a bracelet.

References

External links

Official results

World Series of Poker
World Series of Poker
World Series of Poker